Darío Osvaldo Gastón García Aguilar (born July 20, 1968, in Rosario, Santa Fe) is a retired male judoka from Argentina. He claimed the gold medal in the Men's Light-Middleweight (– 78 kg) division at the 1995 Pan American Games in Mar de Plata. García represented his native country in four consecutive Summer Olympics, starting in 1988.

References

External links 
 
 
 

1968 births
Living people
Argentine male judoka
Judoka at the 1988 Summer Olympics
Judoka at the 1992 Summer Olympics
Judoka at the 1996 Summer Olympics
Judoka at the 2000 Summer Olympics
Judoka at the 1991 Pan American Games
Judoka at the 1995 Pan American Games
Judoka at the 1999 Pan American Games
Olympic judoka of Argentina
Sportspeople from Rosario, Santa Fe
Pan American Games gold medalists for Argentina
Pan American Games bronze medalists for Argentina
Pan American Games medalists in judo
Medalists at the 1991 Pan American Games
Medalists at the 1995 Pan American Games
Medalists at the 1999 Pan American Games
20th-century Argentine people
21st-century Argentine people